The European Union ambassador in Beijing is the official representative of the European Commission to the Government of China, concurrently accredited to Mongolia.

List of representatives

References 

European Union
China